PopTop Software Inc. was an American video game developer based in Fenton, Missouri. The company was founded in 1993 by Phil Steinmeyer, acquired by Take-Two Interactive in July 2000, became part of the 2K label in January 2005, and was closed down in March 2006. It was known for its construction and management simulation games.

History 
PopTop Software was founded by video game programmer and designer Phil Steinmeyer in 1993. On July 24, 2000, Take-Two Interactive announced that it had acquired PopTop Software. The deal saw a transaction of 559,100 shares in Take-Two Interactive, valued at an estimated . On January 25, 2005, Take-Two Interactive announced the opening of publishing label 2K, which would henceforth manage their development studios, including PopTop Software.

Steinmeyer left PopTop Software in late 2004 and founded New Crayon Games, which later developed Bonnie's Bookstore, in May 2005. On March 7, 2006, it was announced that PopTop Software's operations had been merged into Firaxis Games, another 2K studio.

Games developed

References 

2K (company)
Defunct companies based in Missouri
Defunct video game companies of the United States
Take-Two Interactive divisions and subsidiaries
Video game companies disestablished in 2006
Video game companies established in 1993
Video game development companies